The Panzer Selbstfahrlafette IV Ausf. C, or Pz. Sfl. IVc. also known as Grille 10, the 8.8cm Flak 37 auf Sonderfahrgestell ("on special chassis"), was a German mobile gun platform for the widespread 8.8 cm anti-aircraft/anti-tank gun, built in 1941. It was a lightly armoured vehicle. Only 3 prototypes were produced.

Development 
A heavy Panzerjäger (anti tank self-propelled gun) was ordered to be built by the Waffenamt (the German Government's Weapons building agency) in 1941. The vehicle was originally intended to be a self propelled assault gun, and was developed as such, but part way through development it was realised that with the anti aircraft usefulness of the 8.8 cm gun, it could also be used in the role of an anti-aircraft vehicle. In late 1942, there were 3 prototypes made. In 1944 the armament was modified.
It was built by Krupp. Various guns were considered.

Specifications 
The vehicle had a crew of 8 and weighed 26 tons. It was powered by the Maybach HL90 engine. The turret was open, with the sidewalls coming down on each side to make a platform. However, with them raised, it would provide some protection for the crew. The crew were also protected from the front by a shield for the gun. The vehicle was built on a Panzer IV chassis, with extensive modifications. While a number of different guns were considered, the vehicle eventually ended up being armed with the FlaK 41 L/74. Sources also suggest that the side and rear armour plates could be unhinged and opened to make the mounted gun completely traversable.

Service 
One example was deployed to the Western front.

References

World War II tank destroyers of Germany
Military vehicles introduced from 1940 to 1944